Charity fraud is the act of using deception to get money from people who believe they are making donations to a charity.  Often a person or a group of people will make material representations that they are a charity or part of a charity and ask prospective donors for contributions to the non-existent charity. Charity fraud not only includes fictitious charities but also deceitful business acts. Deceitful business acts include businesses accepting donations and not using the money for its intended purposes, or soliciting funds under the pretense of need.

Examples
On April 20, 1918, The New York Times published an article about a charity fraud committed by the Secretary of the Cripples' Welfare Society, George W. Ryder. Ryder pleaded guilty to using mail fraud to use the donations for his personal gain.
On November 13, 1992, The New York Times released an article about fraudulent solicitations supporting a cause. Often, beside the cash register in stores, a collection is taken for a charity or for people in need. Although there have been many store owners that legitimately donate the spare change to the specified charity, there are a few who act fraudulently. In this specific case, the small-change donations were being kept by the vendors. The article states that the vendors paid a $2 per month fee to use the charity's name.
After Hurricane Ian in the U.S. in 2022, the FBI Tampa Bay office warned that charity fraud scammers were at work, going door to door and making phone calls.

Prevention in the United States of America
There are controls and laws governing charities and businesses that accept donations. The Internal Revenue Service (IRS) with the Better Business Bureau (BBB) has regulations that can be found on their websites.
 
The United States Federal Bureau of Investigation (FBI) provides online information about avoiding charity fraud, such as fraudulent schemes that emerge in the wake of natural disasters, claiming to be providing disaster relief. The Internet Crime Complaint Center maintains a list of guidelines to avoid charity fraud when making a donation.

It is advised that people should follow certain guidelines when they donate and that they should consult a list such as the one on the BBB's website. This list includes the participants in the BBB Wise Giving Alliance's National Charity Seal Program. Participants have met standards for charity accountability and may, for a fee, display the seal logo on their websites as well as any other printed documents.

Contrast with badge charity
Charity fraud is distinguished from badge charity in which the charity does exist, but an inordinate percentage the funds donated are absorbed by professional fundraisers and operating expenses of the charity rather than the causes described in solicitations.

See also
Clothing scam companies
Confidence trick

References

External links
United States:
 Better Business Bureau's Wise Giving Alliance
 CharityWatch Charity Ratings
 Charity Navigator's giving tips including the 5 Steps to Informed Giving
 Federal Trade Commissiojn - Charity Fraud
 Give.org BBB Standards for Charity Accountability
 Haitian Earthquake Relief Fraud Alert
 IRS: Life Cycle of an Exempt Organization
 National Charity Seal Program

United Kingdom:
 Charity Commission - find out if a charitable organisation is formally registered

Fraud
 Fraud